The steamboat Dauntless operated in the early 1900s as part of the Puget Sound Mosquito Fleet.

Career 
Dauntless was built in 1899 by Matthew McDowell at Tacoma to replace the Defiance (I) on the Seattle-Tacoma-East Pass run.  Dauntless was 93' long and rated at 91 tons.

In 1900, Captain McDowell built a newer and larger Defiance (II) at Tacoma, and sold Dauntless to the Moe Brothers, who put the vessel in the Bainbridge Island service.

In 1902, the Moe Brothers sold Dauntless to L.B. Hastings and Captain Mann, of Port Townsend.  They put Dauntless on the Port Townsend-Irondale run.  A steel mill at Irondale caused that town to boom, and Dauntless, still capable of 11-knot speed, made quick trips on this route.

On December 30, 1923, a storm caused Dauntless to break loose from her moorings at Appletree Cove.  The vessel was blown across the sound and washed up on the beach at Meadow Point, breaking up on the beach.

Notes

References
 Newell, Gordon R., and Williamson, Joe, Pacific Steamboats, Superior Publishing, Seattle, WA 1958.
 Newell, Gordon R., ed., H.W. McCurdy Marine History of the Pacific Northwest, Superior Publishing, Seattle, WA 1966.

See also
 Matthew McDowell

External links
 steamboat University of Washington digital library photograph showing Dauntless on Puget Sound, circa 1903 (Asahel Curtis photograph)

Steamboats of Washington (state)
History of Washington (state)
Ships built in Tacoma, Washington